City High was an American R&B/hip hop trio consisting of rappers/singers Ryan Toby, Robbie Pardlo, and Claudette Ortiz. City High is best known for their song "What Would You Do?", which earned a Grammy nomination.

Career
In 2001, City High released "What Would You Do?" from their self-titled album. Their follow-up single was "Caramel", with a remix featuring rapper Eve. The final single from the group's debut and only album was "City High Anthem".

Prior to the creation of City High, bandmates Claudette Ortiz and Robbie Pardlo dated throughout their high school years. After meeting and performing for Wyclef Jean, they were signed to his Booga Basement recording label. As Wooga Booga already had a duo, they invited Ryan Toby and became the City High trio instead. Following her breakup with Pardlo, Ortiz went on to date Toby. Ortiz and Toby married in 2004, but later divorced in 2007.

Discography

Albums

Singles

References

East Coast hip hop groups
Musical groups established in 1999
Musical groups disestablished in 2003
Musical groups from New Jersey
Hip hop groups from Philadelphia
Musical groups from Philadelphia
American musical trios
People from Willingboro Township, New Jersey
1999 establishments in New Jersey
Interscope Records artists